Sree Narayana Mangalam College, Maliankara, is a general degree college located in Maliankara, Kerala. It was established in the year 1964. The college is affiliated with Mahatma Gandhi University. This college offers different courses in arts, commerce and science.

Departments

Science

Physics
Chemistry
Mathematics
Botany
Statistics
Zoology

Arts and Commerce

Malayalam
English
Hindi
Sanskrit
History
Political Science
Economics
Physical Education
Commerce

Accreditation
The college is recognized by the University Grants Commission (UGC).

Notable alumni
 Sunil P. Ilayidom, Writer, professor
 Sachy (K. R. Sachidanandan), Script Writer, Film Director
 K. P. Dhanapalan, Politician

References

External links
http://www.snmcollege.com

Universities and colleges in Ernakulam district
Educational institutions established in 1964
1964 establishments in Kerala
Arts and Science colleges in Kerala
Colleges affiliated to Mahatma Gandhi University, Kerala